Ultimate X4 is a Marvel Comics miniseries, set in the Ultimate Marvel universe outside the mainstream continuity.  It features a crossover between the Ultimate X-Men and the Ultimate Fantastic Four. This miniseries is the first canonical team-up of the X-Men and the Fantastic Four in the Ultimate Marvel universe.  The arc consists of two parts, UX4 #1 (December 2005) and UX4 #2 (January 2006).

Story
The X-Men receive a seemingly alien distress signal and fly away with the Blackbird to track it down.  Only Wolverine, Shadowcat and Iceman remain at the X-Mansion.  In the meanwhile, Rhona Burchill, the Mad Thinker, raids the understaffed X-Mansion and steals Cerebro, and manages to frame the Fantastic Four for this crime.

Rhona reveals that she was contracted by Advanced Idea Mechanics (AIM) to steal Cerebro and turn it over to them. After being paid for her work, Rhona betrays and kills the AIM operatives sent to retrieve Cerebro, since her true intention was to use Cerebro's technology to increase her intellect even further.

The X-Men trio raids the Baxter Building and fights a surprised and angry FF, but they are easily subdued.  Burchill then reveals herself as the true culprit and gloats how vastly Cerebro has enhanced her mind, allowing her to take control of peoples' minds and even machines.  Mister Fantastic states that Rhona's mind control abilities have increased frighteningly, and modifies the suits of both teams to provide makeshift psi protection. The X-Men find out that the alien message was bogus, and that Rhona's psi barriers have increased drastically.  The X-Men trio and the FF reluctantly team up against the Mad Thinker. Rhona is able to find a way around Reed's modifications and take control of everyone except him and Wolverine, but Reed beats Rhona by reprogramming Cerebro so that instead of gaining ultimate knowledge, Rhona would gain ultimate empathy for others instead.  When she tries to flee, Wolverine sabotages her plane, and it explodes.  The X-Men and the FF part ways amicably.

Trade paperback
As with all currently published Marvel Comics, Ultimate X4 has been made available in trade paperback form. Titled “Ultimate X-Men Ultimate Fantastic Four”, the trade paperback also comes with the Official Handbook of the Ultimate Marvel Universe #1-2 inside, which gives details on many characters in the Ultimate Marvel World.

X4, Ultimate